Stick-fighting, stickfighting, or stick fighting, is a variety of martial arts which use simple long, slender, blunt, hand-held, generally wooden "sticks" for fighting, such as a gun staff, bō, jō, walking stick, baston, arnis sticks or similar weapons. Some techniques can also be used with a sturdy umbrella or even with a sword or dagger in its scabbard.

Thicker and/or heavier blunt weapons such as clubs or the mace are outside the scope of "stick-fighting" (since they cannot be wielded with such precision, so sheer force of impact is more important), as are more formed weapons such as the taiaha used by the Māori people of New Zealand, and the macuahuitl used by the Aztec people of Mesoamerica in warfare.

Although many systems are defensive combat techniques intended for use if attacked while lightly armed, others such as kendo, arnis, and gatka were developed as safe training methods for dangerous weapons. Whatever their history, many stick-fighting techniques lend themselves to being treated as sports.

In addition to systems specifically devoted to stick-fighting, certain other disciplines include it, either in its own right, as in the Tamil martial art silambam, or merely as part of a polyvalent training including other weapons and/or bare handed fighting, as in Kerala's kalaripayattu tradition, where these wooden weapons serve as preliminary training before practice of the more dangerous metal weapons.

Stick-fights between individuals or large gatherings between sub-tribes where men fight duels were an important part of the anthropological heritage of various cultures. On tribes such as the Surma people of Ethiopia, donga stick-fighting is an important cultural practice and the best means of showing off to look for a bride, nude or nearly so, and their more warlike neighbors, the Nyangatom people, who fight duels bare-chested, the aim being to inflict visible stripes on the back of the adversary, using not plain staffs but sticks with a flexible, whipping tail-end.

Styles

Traditional European systems of stick-fighting included a wide variety of methods of quarterstaff combat, which were detailed in numerous manuscripts written by masters-at-arms. Many of these methods became extinct but others adapted and survived as folk-sports and self-defence systems. Examples include Portugal's jogo do pau, the related juego del palo of the Canary Islands, France's canne de combat or la canne, Poland's palcaty and Italy's scherma di bastone. Giuseppe Cerri's 1854 manual Trattato teorico e pratico della scherma di bastone is influenced by masters of the Italian school of swordsmanship, Achille Marozzo and perhaps Francesco Alfieri.

The French system of la canne is still practiced as a competitive sport. A self-defense adaptation of la canne developed by Swiss master-at-arms Pierre Vigny in the early 1900s has been revived as part of the curriculum of bartitsu.

In the US during the early years of the 1900s, fencer and self-defense specialist A. C. Cunningham developed a unique system of stick-fighting using a walking stick or umbrella, which he recorded in his book The Cane as a Weapon.

Singlestick was developed as a method of training in the use of backswords such as the cavalry sabre and naval cutlass. It was a popular pastime in the UK from the 18th to the early 20th century, and was a fencing event at the 1904 Summer Olympics. Although interest in the art declined, a few fencing coaches continued to train with the stick and competitions in this style of stick-fighting were reintroduced into the Royal Navy in the 1980s by commander Locker Madden. The art continues to gain a small following amongst the martial art community in the UK, Australia, Canada and the US.

Latin America also has its share of martial arts devoted to stick-fighting, including Venezuela's juego del garrote, Brazil's palo do Brasil and Maculelê, Trinidad's calinda and the South Americans' Eskrima Kombat.

Sticks and staves of various sizes are common weapons in Asian martial arts, in which they vary in design, size, weight, materials and methodology, and are often used interchangeably and alongside open-hand techniques. For example, eskrima or arnis of the Philippines uses sticks traditionally crafted from rattan or from butterfruit tree and may be wielded singly or as a pair.

See also

Angampora
Banshay
Bataireacht
Bōjutsu
Canne de combat
Gatka
Juego del palo
Jūkendō
Jōdō
Kalaripayattu
Kendo
Kenjutsu
Krabi–krabong
Kuttu Varisai
Mardani khel
Quarterstaff, British historical stick fighting weapon
Shillelagh (club)
Silambam
Silambam Asia
Tahtib
Thang-ta
Varma kalai
World Silambam Association
Matrague (Algeria)

References

 

br:Bazhata